was a town located in Shimomashiki District, Kumamoto Prefecture, Japan.

As of 2003, the town had an estimated population of 5,120 and the density of 122.75 persons per km2. The total area was 41.71 km2.

On November 1, 2004, Chūō, along with the town of Tomochi (also from Shimomashiki District), was merged to create the town of Misato and no longer exists as an independent municipality.

External links
 Official website of Misato 

Dissolved municipalities of Kumamoto Prefecture